The 10th Central Committee of the Communist Party of Vietnam was elected at the 10th National Congress of the Communist Party of Vietnam. The 10th Central Committee elected the 10th Politburo and the 10th Secretariat.

Plenums
The Central Committee (CC) is not a permanent institution. Instead, it convenes plenary sessions between party congresses. When the CC is not in session, decision-making powers are delegated to its internal bodies; that is, the Politburo and the Secretariat. None of these organs are permanent bodies either; typically, they convene several times a month.

Composition

Members

Alternates

References

External links
  

10th Central Committee of the Communist Party of Vietnam